David Djigla (born 23 August 1995) is a Beninese international footballer who most recently played as a striker for Chamois Niortais.

Career
Played at 2019 Africa Cup of Nations when the team reached the quarter-finals

Career statistics

Club

International

International goals
As of match played 24 March 2019. Benin score listed first, score column indicates score after each Djigla goal.

References

External links
 

1995 births
Living people
Beninese footballers
Benin international footballers
Beninese expatriate footballers
Association football forwards
FC Girondins de Bordeaux players
Chamois Niortais F.C. players
Ligue 1 players
Ligue 2 players
Expatriate footballers in France
Beninese expatriate sportspeople in France
People from Atlantique Department
2019 Africa Cup of Nations players
Benin youth international footballers